Seguy is a surname. Notable people with the surname include:

 Irbis Seguy (r. 642–651), ruler of the Western Turkic Khaganate (Western Turkic Empire)
 Rogelio Montemayor Seguy (born 1947), Mexican politician and economist

See also
 Séguy, a French surname